Mirae Scientists Street (Future Scientists Street) is a street in a newly developed area in Pyongyang to house scientific institutions of the Kim Chaek University of Technology and their employees. The six-lane street, located between Pyongyang Railway station and the Taedong river, is lined by high rise apartments. The area was formally opened on November 3, 2015.

The tallest building is the 53-story blue Mirae Unha Tower. The street is designed to emphasize Kim Jong-un's focus on science and technology, built around the regime's nuclear weapons development.

Mirae Scientists Street was reportedly the first location where the Mirae public WiFi network was installed.

References 

Road infrastructure in North Korea
Transport in Pyongyang
Streets
2015 establishments in North Korea